Ivan Brouka (born 20 April 1980) is a Belarusian handball player for SKA Minsk and the Belarusian national team.

References

External links

1980 births
Living people
Belarusian male handball players
Sportspeople from Minsk
Expatriate handball players
Belarusian expatriate sportspeople in Ukraine